Everything You Know is the third studio album by Pennsylvania hardcore punk band Wisdom In Chains. It was released in 2009 on I Scream Records.

Track list

References

2009 albums
Wisdom in Chains albums